Port Esquivel is a settlement in the south coast of Jamaica that primarily handles aluminium oxide (alumina).

History
The original Puerta de Esquivela was a harbour completed in 1959 and named after the first deputy governor of Jamaica, Juan de Esquivel. Port Esquivel as a loading port was established in the 1950s by Alumina Jamaica Limited. Alumina shipments from the port started in early 1952, when the country's alumina industry was still in its infancy. Port activities were halted during Hurricane Ivan in September 2004.

Operations
Two vessels can berth at the port concurrently.

A -long channel allows for the export of alumina and molasses and for the import of fuel oil and other alumina-related products like bauxite. Texaco supplies oil to the Jamaica Public Service (JPS) via its oil storage plant on Port Esquivel. Port Esquivel has its own fire brigade.

Environmental impact
Oil pollution from leakages at the Texaco storage facility similarly damaged the nearby corals.

References

Populated places in Jamaica